Mike Cake (born 4 April 1946) is a former speedway rider from England.

Speedway career 
Cake rode in the top two tiers of British Speedway from 1967 to 1975, riding for various clubs. In 1968, he returned the leading greensheet average (jontly with Mick Handley) and second highest actual average during the 1968 British League Division Two season, when riding for the Plymouth Devils.

References 

Living people
1946 births
British speedway riders
Exeter Falcons riders
Peterborough Panthers riders
Plymouth Devils riders
Poole Pirates riders